ZPC (Zero Population Count) is a first-person shooter video game which uses the Marathon 2 engine. It was developed by Zombie LLC, published by GT Interactive and released on October 31, 1996. It was noted for its stylized look adapted from artwork by Aidan Hughes (also credited with the game's concept).

Gameplay
The story focuses on Arman, an exiled "Warrior Messiah" who has come of age and sets out to reclaim his throne.

Development
The game had a development budget of less than $1 million.

In other media
At some point prior to November 2003, Hughes announced plans to create or bring about a full-length ZPC film, but nothing came of this.

Reception

Air Hendrix of GamePro found ZPC severely outdated, for both its 2D graphics and its gameplay, which he found made little advance beyond 1993's Doom. However, he remarked that the "stark, sombre visual style" and moody music would highly appeal to many, and that this would make the gameplay more enjoyable to those players. A Next Generation critic said much the same: "Gameplay sticks to the tried-and-true tactics of the legion of Doom clones ... While the level and puzzle design are entirely satisfying, ZPC would be just another pretender to the throne if it weren't for the tremendous atmosphere provided by artists Aiden Hughes and musicians Roland and Paul Barker". He elaborated that "Hughes's predominantly black and red palette and structuralist approach make ZPC one of the most unique-looking games around."

References

External links 
 Zombie Studios
 Archive of Infogrames's official website for the game (no longer online as of 2004)
 ZPC at Traxus Project, a Marathon wiki

1996 video games
Classic Mac OS games
First-person shooters
GT Interactive games
Marathon engine games
Sprite-based first-person shooters
Video games developed in the United States
Video games with 2.5D graphics
Windows games
Zombie Studios games